Leo Sims is an American former Negro league infielder who played in the 1930s.

Sims played for the Birmingham Black Barons and Atlanta Black Crackers in 1938. In 11 recorded games, he posted eight hits in 43 plate appearances.

References

External links
 and Seamheads

Year of birth missing
Year of death missing
Place of birth missing
Place of death missing
Atlanta Black Crackers players
Birmingham Black Barons players